Sotirios Panagiotopoulos (born 5 January 1930) is a Greek former wrestler. He competed in the men's Greco-Roman bantamweight at the 1952 Summer Olympics.

References

External links
  

1930 births
Possibly living people
Greek male sport wrestlers
Olympic wrestlers of Greece
Wrestlers at the 1952 Summer Olympics
Place of birth missing (living people)